The 2021 European Championship B is an international rugby league tournament that took place in October 2021. Originally scheduled to take place in October 2020, the tournament was postponed in July 2020 due to the COVID-19 pandemic. A revised schedule was announced in April 2021, and the tournament details were confirmed in August 2021.

Background
Ukraine entered the tournament after the 2020 European Championship C was cancelled.  withdrew as their domestic competition was yet to restart. The winner of the tournament will be promoted to 2022 European Championship.

John Risman, who is a lifetime honorary president of Serbian Rugby League presented the trophy and medals to the winner of the tournament. The tournament was won by Serbia, with Ukraine finishing runner-up and Russia third.

Participants

Notes:

Squads
On 29 September 2021, each competing nation announced their squads for the tournament.

Serbia
Stefan Simovic (RLC Dorcol Tigers), Aleksandar Pavlovic, Djordje Krnjeta, Dragan Jankovic, Dzavid Jasari, Enis Bibic, Nemanja Manojlovic, Stevan Stevanovic, Vladimir Milutinovic (RLC Partizan 1953), Lazar Zivkovic, Mihajlo Jovic, Stefan Arsic (RLC Radnicki Nis), Aleksandar Djordjevic, Marko Jankovic, Milos Calic, Milos Zogovic, Miodrag Tomic, Nikola Djuric Rajko Trifunovic, Stefan Nedeljkovic, Vojislav Dedic (RLC Red Star)

Russia
Ilia Danilov (RC Dinamo), Evgenii Chevankov, Artem Egorov, Roman Ovchinnikov, Sergei Sazonov, Pavel Smirnov, Dmitrii Strukov, Ivan Suracov, Ivan Troitskii, Artem Tiutrin, Ivan Vabishchevich, Andrei Zdobnikov (RLC Locomotive), Egor Petukhov (RC Moscow Dragons), Vadim Buriak, Igor Chuprin, Aram Gazarian, Anton Matiushkin, Zakir Prizniakov (RLC Olimp), Andrey Perin (RC Spartak), Kirill Bozhko, Maxim Martynov (RC Zelenograd)

Ukraine
Liubomyr Beznoshchuk, Vitalii Boichuk (Carpathian Trinity), Anatolii Hrankovskyi, Taras Kolisnyk, Vitalii Puchkov, Dmytro Semerenko, Oleksandr Shcherbyna, Oleksandr Skorbach, Oleksandr Syvokoz, Mykhailo Troian, Evhenii Trusov, Bohdan Vepryk, Ihor Yurkin (Kharkiv Legion XIII), Valentyn Korchak, Orest Adamyk, Valentyn Koval, Danylo Kozak, Igor Vashchuk (Lviv Tigers), Volodymyr Radchyk (Rivne Giants)

Table

Fixtures

References 

European rugby league competitions
2021 in rugby league
Rugby League European Championship B